Aadyam Jolie Pinne Kalyanam is a 2022 Indian Malayalam-language mini-series created by and starring Vimal Kumar and Jisma Jiji, along with Sharan S, Samarth Ambujakshan, Arya Jagadeesh and Smruthi Anish in supporting roles.

The series lasted for 4 episodes. The first episode titled was released on 30 July 2022 and the last episode on 2 December 2022.

Cast
Vimal Kumar as Satheeshan
Jisma Jiji as Revathi
Sharan S as Raghu sir
Smruthi Anish as Amminiyamma
Samarth Ambujakshan as Vinod Amballoor
Arya Jagadeesh as Sumi
Midhun Krishna as Vishnu
Sivaprasad Ajayan as Achal
Adithya Shiju as Young Satheeshan
Jess Sweejan as Young Revathy

Guest
Shine Tom Chacko as Antoney

Episodes

Soundtrack

References

External links
 

Malayalam-language web series